Popular Holdings Limited, more commonly known as just Popular or colloquially as the Popular Bookstore, is a Singaporean multinational bookstore chain. Aside from Singapore, it also has subsidiaries in countries such as Canada, China (including Hong Kong, Macau and Taiwan), Malaysia and the United Kingdom.

During the financial year of 2011, it had a turnover of approximately S$735.9million.

Overview
The first Popular Bookstore was set up in 1936 by Chou Sing Chu in North Bridge Road, Singapore, initially focusing on retailing Chinese books and stationery. In March 2006, Popular Holdings was the main organiser of BookFest@Singapore, the first Chinese-language book fair ever held outside of China.

In May 2006, Popular Holdings staged the inaugural BookFest@Malaysia in Kuala Lumpur. It is a platform for established publishers to showcase their latest publications and renowned authors to meet and interact with the readers. The inaugural BookFest@Hong Kong was organized in 2008. By 2009, the annual BookFest has become a major event of the book industries in Singapore, Malaysia and Hong Kong.

The company was founded with the intention to publish, distribute and retail Chinese language books or books catering to the interests of Singaporeans. Ever since, one of the company's goals has been to cater to the interests of a wider, more diverse clientele.

Board of directors 
Popular is headed by Chou Cheng Ngok, who is the Group chief executive officer and Executive Director of the Group. Lim Lee Ngoh heads the operations in Malaysia and Singapore, while her counterpart in Greater China is Poon Chi Wai, Ponch. Desmond Wee Guan Oei is the Non-Executive chairman and Executive Director of the Board and other directors include Lim Soon Tze, David Chia Tian Bin and Christopher Chia.

Former directors include Ching Ging Oong, Poh Ping Tek, Ching Cheng Pong, Ang Tuak Liak, Vangatharaman Ramayah and Chim Choon Cheng.

Group of Companies 
The Group currently carries out its publishing activities through subsidiaries operating in Singapore, Malaysia, Hong Kong, Macau, Taiwan and Canada. Its bookstore operations currently have a network of over 130 Popular Bookstores in Singapore, Malaysia and Hong Kong. It now has its core businesses in retail, distribution, publishing and e-learning.

Retail 
Back in 1936, Popular focused on the retailing of Chinese books and stationery. It has now expanded its product offerings to include English books, Malay books, textbooks and assessment books, Gadgets & IT products, household appliances, titbits, stationery, multimedia products and many more. It currently has stores in Singapore, Malaysia and Hong Kong.

Bookfest 
POPULAR held its first BookFest in 2006. It had started out with the objective of promoting the reading of Chinese across regions and bringing in the foremost works of Chinese literature.

Distribution and Publishing 
In 1999, POPULAR Group set up a purchasing office in Taiwan to purchase Chinese books for Singapore, Malaysia and Hong Kong. With the expansion of the business, Popular Book Company Ltd was established in 2003 as a subsidiary of POPULAR Group. POPULAR Group now exports Chinese books in Taiwan, distributes books to Singapore, Malaysia, and Hong Kong through around 188 POPULAR outlets. Novum Organum, also a subsidiary of POPULAR, is the distributor for the Group’s house brands and focuses on the book markets in Singapore and Malaysia.

E-Learning 
POPULAR made an early foray into e-Learning in Hong Kong, with the establishment of Popular e-Learning (HK) Ltd. (‘PeLH’) in 2000. It provides e-Learning software and solutions to schools in Hong Kong, South East Asia and Taiwan. In 2001, Guangzhou Cyber Progress Information Technology Limited (GCPIT) was established to support PeLH in its efforts.

Subsidiaries 
The list of its subsidiaries is listed below:

Active & Independent Education Limited
Ampress Limited
Arajasa Corporation Sdn Bhd
CD Rama Limited
CD Rama Sdn Bhd 
Cyber Progress Technology Limited
Educational Publishing House Limited
Educational Publishing House Pte Ltd
Educational Publishing House, Limited 
Eduland Pte Ltd
EduSmart Company Limited
English Language Publishing Limited
EPH Publishing (M) Sdn Bhd
Epilogue Catering Ptd Ltd
Guangzhou Cyber Progress Information Technology Limited
Guangzhou Pan Lloyds Information Technology Development Company Limited
Harris Book Company (M) Sdn Bhd
Harris Book Company Limited
Harris Book Company Pte Ltd
Kam Pui Enterprises Limited
Kinder Education Press Limited
New Chapter Book Company Pte Ltd
Novum Organum Publishing House (M) Sdn Bhd 
Novum Organum Publishing House Pte Ltd
Pan Lloyds Education Limited
Pan Lloyds Publishers Limited
Popular Book Company (Canada) Limited 
Popular Book Company Limited
Popular Book Company Pte Ltd
Popular Book Co. (Malaysia) Sdn Bhd
Popular e-Learning (Beijing) Ltd
Popular e-Learning (H.K.) Limited
Popular e-Learning Holdings Pte Ltd
Popular Land Investment Pte Ltd 
Popular Land Pte Ltd
Popular Modern Books Company Limited
Popular Warehouse and Distribution Pte Ltd
PopularWorld (Beijing) Limited
PopularWorld.com Pte Ltd
Prologue Publishing Pte Ltd 
Seashore Publishing (M) Sdn Bhd
Smart English Company Limited

References

External links 

 Popular Singapore official site (Singapore)
 Popular Holdings official site (International)

Book publishing companies of Singapore
Publishing companies established in 1924
Retail companies established in 1924
1924 establishments in Singapore
Companies formerly listed on the Singapore Exchange
Singaporean brands